Ubris was a literary journal published by the University of Maine. It is most notable for having published a number of Stephen King's stories and poems when he was a student at the university.

References

Literary magazines published in the United States
Magazines with year of establishment missing
University of Maine publications
Stephen King
Magazines published in Maine